Greatest Hits II is a compilation album by the British rock band Queen, released on 28 October 1991. The album consisted of Queen's biggest hits between 1981 and 1991, from the UK chart-topper "Under Pressure" to "The Show Must Go On".

The compilation Greatest Hits II reached number one on the UK Albums Chart, and is the tenth best-selling album in the UK with sales of 3.9 million copies as of 2014. It is the seventh best-selling album in Germany, the thirteenth best-selling album in France, and the best-selling album by a foreign artist in Finland. Accumulated sales (Greatest Hits II and Classic Queen for the US and Canada combined) are in excess of 25 million worldwide.

Freddie Mercury designed the crest on the album cover, using the astrological signs of the four members: two Leos (Roger Taylor and John Deacon), one Cancer (Brian May) and one Virgo (Mercury).

Content
The compilation contains most of Queen's hits from 1981 to 1991. The singles "Body Language", "Back Chat", "Las Palabras de Amor", "Thank God It's Christmas", "Princes of the Universe" and "Scandal" were omitted for this release. "Las Palabras de Amor", "Thank God It's Christmas" and "Princes of the Universe" were later included on Greatest Hits III.

Release
Greatest Hits II was released less than a month before the death of lead singer Freddie Mercury and was the last Queen release of any kind while he was still alive. The album was not initially available in the United States and was later replaced with its counterpart Classic Queen in early 1992. Greatest Hits II was later made available in the US in two box sets: Greatest Hits I & II and The Platinum Collection: Greatest Hits I, II & III. On 19 April 2011, Hollywood Records released the newly remastered version of Greatest Hits II in the United States and Japan.

A companion video release entitled Greatest Flix II was released at the same time, but is currently out of print. Most of the videos are now available on the DVD Greatest Video Hits 2 with the exception of the videos from the 1991 Innuendo album.

Track listing

Charts

Weekly charts

Year-end charts

Certifications and sales

}

See also
List of best-selling albums in Brazil
List of best-selling albums in Finland
List of best-selling albums in Germany
Top best-selling albums by UK Chart

References

External links
 Queen official website: Discography: Greatest Hits II: includes lyrics of "Hitman."

Queen (band) compilation albums
1991 greatest hits albums
Parlophone compilation albums
Hollywood Records compilation albums